Park City School District  (PCSD) is a school district headquartered in Park City, Utah.

The district's service area includes the portion of Park City in Summit County (almost all of Park City), the census designated places of Summit Park and Snyderville, the vast majority of the Silver Summit CDP, and a portion of the East Basin CDP.

History
Jill Gildea became the superintendent in 2018.

In 2018 the school district bought a house that would be used as the residence of its superintendent.

In 2022 the board of trustees set 2024 as the new expiration date for the contract of Gildea.

Operations
In 2018, of the superintendents of public school districts in Utah, the superintendent of Park City had the highest annual salary.

Schools
 Secondary schools    
 Park City High School
 Treasure Mountain Junior High School
 Ecker Hill Middle School

 Elementary schools
 Jeremy Ranch Elementary School
 McPolin Elementary School
 Parley's Park Elementary School
 Trailside Elementary School

 Preschools
 Preschool

References

Further reading

External links
 Park City School District
School districts in Utah
Summit County, Utah